Peter Coffin (born 1972, Berkeley, California, United States) is an artist based in New York City. Coffin's work is exhibited internationally and featured in several prominent collections.

Peter Coffin is currently collaborating with Al Jaffee inspired by his undergraduate personal encounter with the modern dance choreographer Twyla Tharp. In 2010, Coffin developed a library cataloguing system for the Library of the American Society for Psychical Research in New York City utilizing the colors cast on the library's shelves by the natural light passing through the library's Tiffany Stained Glass windows.

Education
Coffin received a BS and BA from the University of California, Davis in 1995 and MFA from Carnegie Mellon University in 2000.

Select exhibitions

Coffin has showed in over 25 solo exhibitions both internationally and domestically. Installations include:
Here and There (2013), Smithsonian Hirshhorn Museum and Sculpture Garden, Washington D.C., U.S.
Peter Coffin (2013), The National Exemplar, New York City, U.S.
The Prelapsarian (2012), Carl Kostyál Gallery, London, United Kingdom
All Robots Welcome (2010), Social Grease Gallery, Liechtenstein
Don't Knock If You Wouldn't Enter (2009), Al Abarr gallery, Dubai, UAE.
Model of the Universe (e.g. sweet harmonica solo, e.g. the idea of the sun, e.g. Frisbee dog catch in mid air, e.g. brightly colored gem stomes, e.g. the desire for a tropical drink, e.g. dance sweat) (2007), Galerie Emmanuel Perrotin, Paris, France
Tree Pants (2007), The Horticultural Society of New York, Peter Coffin & Djordje Ozbolt, Herald St. London, United Kingdom
The Idea of the Sun (2007), Le Confort Moderne, Poitiers, France.
Limousine Code (2005), Living Room D Lyx Gallery, Malmö, Sweden
Hello Headspace (2005), Gallery Fonti, Naples, Italy
The Feraliminal Lycanthropizer (2005), Champion Fine Art, Los Angeles, U.S.
Collection (or, How I Spent a Year) (2004), MoMA, New York City, U.S.
Turn on the Lights (2004), South London Gallery, London, United Kingdom
It Chooses You (2004), Andrew Kreps Gallery, New York City, U.S.
Natural Habits (2004), The Paine Art Center, Oshkosh, Wisconsin, U.S.
When Interwoven Echoes Drip into a Hybrid Body Migros Museum für Gegenwartskunst, Zurich, Long Island City, New York City, U.S.

Galleries
Coffin is represented by Herald Street in London and Haydon Boss in San Francisco.
Peter Coffin also recently exhibited at Venus Over Manhattan in New York with the solo exhibition A.E.I.O.U.

Permanent works

Works by the artist can be seen at:
 Aspen Art Museum, Aspen, CO
 Detroit Institute of Arts, Detroit, MI
 The Wanås Foundation sculpture park, Skåne, Sweden:
 Untitled (Tree Pants); jeans tailored to trees in the park (collaboration with Levi Strauss & Co).
 MoMA, New York, NY 
 Storm King Art Center New Windsor, NY

Audio work
In 2005, Coffin released the Music for Plants compilation album with tracks from forty artists including Ara Peterson, Ariel Pink, Arto Lindsay, Sun Burned Hand of the Man, Jutta Koether, Alan Licht & Tom Verlaine, LoVid, Christian Marclay, Dearraindrop, and Mice Parade.

References

External links
Peter Coffin Studio, artist page
Saatchi-Gallery, artist page
Peter Coffin at Artfacts

American artists
Living people
1972 births
University of California, Davis alumni
Carnegie Mellon University College of Fine Arts alumni